Nolan Harry Luhn (July 27, 1921 – November 27, 2011) was a professional American football player who played wide receiver for five seasons for the Green Bay Packers. He was born in Kenney, Texas.  Luhn died on November 27, 2011 in Coffeyville, Kansas.

References

1921 births
2011 deaths
American football wide receivers
Green Bay Packers players
Kilgore Rangers football players
Tulsa Golden Hurricane football players
Coffeyville Red Ravens football coaches
People from Austin County, Texas
Players of American football from Texas